Kulala is a Hindu caste whose traditionally pursued pottery trade and farming as a profession commonly found in the Indian states of Andhra pradesh, Karnataka, Kerala and southern parts of Tamilnadu. They belong to the Other Backward Class group.

Etymology
Kulala are the descendants of the three sons of their original ancestor Kulalan, who was the son of Brahma. Kulalan prayed to Brahma to be allowed to create and destroy things daily, so Brahma made him a potter.

Distribution 

Andhra Pradesh

They speak the Telugu language and are also known as Kulala, Kummara,Salivahana and variants of that name, like Kummari.

 Tamil Nadu 

Telugu-speaking Kulala in southern Tamil Nadu use the title Chettiyar (Also known as Telugu Chettiar). They are relatively recent migrants in the southern region of Tamil Nadu.

Some Tamil-speaking Kulalar in south and north Tamil nadu they use the title Velar and Udayar.

 Karnataka 

In Karnataka they speak both Tulu and Kannada language and are also known as kumbara and Kulala. They use the title Shetty.

 Kerala

Kulala (Also known as Kulala Nair) community is found only in the Kasaragod district of Kerala state in India, where they have several exogamous gotras, including Banjan, Banjera, Salian and Upian.They use the title Nair.In Kasaragod district the Tulu speaking Kulala community has another name-Moolya.

This community has completely given up their traditional occupation in Kerala.

Culture 
They follow both Saivism and Vaishnavism.Their rituals and ceremonies are similar to those of the Kama or Vellalar. Some have priests of their own caste, while others employ brahmins. They have claimed a higher social status.

See also 
Pottery
Kumal people
Chettiar
Twenty four Manai Telugu Chettiars

References

Further reading 

Social groups of Andhra Pradesh
Social groups of Kerala
Pot-making castes